John Straub was the Special Assistant to the President and Director of the White House Office of Administration in the Executive Office of the President until September 2006. In this capacity, Mr. Straub was responsible for the day-to-day management and operations of the EOP including serving as CFO and CIO, as well as managing security, facilities, human resources, and travel.  Mr. Straub also served in the George H. W. Bush administration as the Internal Controls Officer.

Before joining the George W. Bush Administration, Mr. Straub served as an Associate Dean for Harvard University's John F. Kennedy School of Government. Earlier in his career, Mr. Straub served as Deputy Chief Administrative Officer and Chief Financial Officer of the United States House of Representatives.

During this time with the US House of Representatives, Mr. Straub is credited with leading the institution to its first ever clean audit opinion in its history.

Mr. Straub currently serves as the Chancellor and Chief Financial Officer for the Roman Catholic Archdiocese of Boston serving under Cardinal Seán P. O'Malley. In appointing Mr. Straub, Cardinal Seán said, “John Straub has been a wonderful addition to the leadership team in the Archdiocese.  He brings a diverse and experienced background to the position of CFO and Chancellor.  The future of the Archdiocese is bright because we have been able to recruit committed and talented people like John.  We are grateful for his service to the Church and we pray that God blesses John and his family now and always.”

Mr. Straub currently serves on the Boards of St. John's Seminary, Campaign for Catholic Schools, Catholic Community Fund, and St. Joseph's College. Mr. Straub also served as the first Executive Director for FIRST, an international youth organization that inspires students in engineering and technology fields.

He received his bachelor's degree from the Catholic University of America.

References

http://www.dcvelocity.com/articles/20090301outbound/

http://www.linkedin.com/in/johnestraub

http://www.zdnet.com/blog/projectfailures/it-politics-killed-white-house-email-project/735

http://www.factmonster.com/ipka/A0197404.html

https://web.archive.org/web/20110218000433/http://www.gpoaccess.gov///plumbook/2004/p6-7_policydev.pdf

https://web.archive.org/web/20110809094145/http://www.freewebs.com/whitehousedirectory/

http://www.bostoncatholic.org/Utility/News-And-Press/Content.aspx?id=24676

Living people
Executive Office of the President of the United States
Catholic University of America alumni
Chief information officers
American chief financial officers
Year of birth missing (living people)